The women's doubles tournament at the 1981 French Open was held from 25 May to 7 June 1981 on the outdoor clay courts at the Stade Roland Garros in Paris, France. Rosalyn Fairbank and Tanya Harford won the title, defeating Candy Reynolds and Paula Smith in the final.

Seeds

Draw

Finals

Top half

Section 1

Section 2

Bottom half

Section 3

Section 4

References
1981 French Open – Women's draws and results at the International Tennis Federation

Women's Doubles
French Open by year – Women's doubles
1981 in women's tennis
1981 in French women's sport